Bent Ole Retvig (15 May 1936 – 15 August 2004) was a Danish professional racing cyclist. He rode in the 1959 and 1960 Tour de France.

References

External links
 

1936 births
2004 deaths
People from Nakskov
Danish male cyclists